The short transient receptor potential channel 4 (TrpC4), also known as Trp-related protein 4, is a protein that in humans is encoded by the TRPC4 gene.

Function 

TrpC4 is a member of the transient receptor potential cation channels. This protein forms a non-selective calcium-permeable cation channel that is activated by Gαi-coupled receptors, Gαq-coupled receptors and tyrosine kinases, and plays a role in multiple processes including endothelial permeability, vasodilation, neurotransmitter release and cell proliferation.

Tissue distribution 

The nonselective cation channel TrpC4 has been shown to be present in high abundance in the cortico-limbic regions of the brain. In addition, TRPC4 mRNA is present in midbrain dopaminergic neurons in the ventral tegmental area and the substantia nigra.

Roles 

Deletion of the trpc4 gene decreases levels of sociability in a social exploration task. These results suggest that TRPC4 may play a role in regulating social anxiety in a number of different disorders. However deletion of the trpc4 gene had no impact on basic or complex strategic learning. Given that the trpc4 gene is expressed in a select population of midbrain dopamine neurons it has been proposed that is may have an important role in dopamine related processes including addiction and attention.

Clinical significance 

Single nucleotide polymorphisms in this gene may be associated with generalized epilepsy with photosensitivity.

Interactions 

TRPC4 has been shown to interact with ITPR1, TRPC1, and TRPC5.

See also
 TRPC

References

Further reading

External links
 

Ion channels